Prairie Center is an unincorporated community located along U.S. Route 52 in LaSalle County, Illinois, United States, approximately 13 miles northwest of Ottawa.

References

Unincorporated communities in Illinois
Unincorporated communities in LaSalle County, Illinois
Ottawa, IL Micropolitan Statistical Area